"We Had Him" is a poem written by Maya Angelou about Michael Jackson. The poem was written for Jackson's memorial service on July 7, 2009, and read there by Queen Latifah in front of the approximately 2.5 to 3 billion worldwide viewers watching the memorial service.

References

2009 poems
Poetry by Maya Angelou
Works about Michael Jackson